The 1991 Australian Endurance Championship was a CAMS sanctioned Australian motor racing title open to Group 3A Touring Cars. The championship, which was the eighth running of the Australian Endurance Championship, began on 8 September 1991 at Sandown Raceway and ended on 6 October at the Mount Panorama Circuit after two rounds. The title was won by Mark Gibbs and Rohan Onslow who shared a Bob Forbes Racing Nissan Skyline GT-R. The 1991 Australian Manufacturers' Championship, which was run concurrently with the Endurance Championship, was awarded to the Nissan Motor Co (Australia).

Teams and drivers
The following teams and drivers competed in the 1991 Australian Endurance Championship and the 1991 Australian Manufacturers' Championship.

Race calendar
The 1991 Australian Endurance Championship and the 1991 Australian Manufacturers' Championship were contested concurrently over a two round series with one race per round.

Results

Australian Endurance Championship

Note: Other placings in the Endurance Championship have not been ascertained.

Australian Manufacturers Championship

Note: Other placings in the Manufacturers' Championship have not been ascertained.

References

External links
 – 1991 Images from the 1991 Tooheys 1000, Round 2 of the 1991 Australian Endurance Championship 
 CAMS Online Manual of Motor Sport > Titles > Australian Titles

Australian Endurance Championship
Australian Manufacturers' Championship
Endurance